Daugmale Parish is an administrative territorial entity of Ķekava Municipality, Latvia. It was an administrative unit of Riga District. The administrative center is Daugmale village. The territory of Daugmale Parish is defined by law as a part of the region of Semigallia.

Towns, villages and settlements of Daugmale Parish 
 Daugmale

References

External links

Parishes of Latvia
Ķekava Municipality
Semigallia